The Genesis Rock (sample 15415) is a sample of Moon rock retrieved by Apollo 15 astronauts James Irwin and David Scott in 1971 during the second lunar EVA, at Spur crater.

Rock
Chemical analysis of the Genesis Rock indicated it is an anorthosite, composed mostly of a type of plagioclase feldspar known as anorthite. The rock was formed in the early stages of the Solar System, at least 4 billion years ago.

It was originally thought they had found a piece of the Moon's primordial crust, but later analysis initially showed that the rock was only 4.1 ± 0.1 billion years old, which is younger than the Moon itself, and was formed after the Moon's crust solidified. It is still an extremely old sample, formed during the Pre-Nectarian period of the Moon's history. Dating of pyroxenes from other lunar anorthosite samples gave a samarium–neodymium age of  crystallization of 4.46 billion years.

See also
 Apollo 15 operations on the Lunar surface
 Hadley–Apennine
 Lunar sample displays
 Stolen and missing Moon rocks

References

External links
Lunar and Planetary Institute - Apollo 15
NASA - Apollo 15
Discovering the Genesis Rock  (From the Apollo Lunar Surface Journal, scroll down to 145:41:48.)
Astronaut Scott examines the Genesis rock.  (image)
 An overview of the samples collected by Apollo 15.  (The Genesis Rock is sample #15415 and is described but not listed by its number.)

Lunar science
Igneous rocks
Apollo 15
Lunar samples
David Scott
James Irwin
Pre-Nectarian